Gore is a town and district in the Southland region of the South Island of New Zealand.

Geography
The town of Gore is located on State Highway 1 64 kilometres northeast of Invercargill and 70 km west of Balclutha – Dunedin and Invercargill are the nearest cities. Gore is a service town for the surrounding farm communities. It is divided by the Mataura River into Gore and East Gore, the majority of the town being situated on the western banks of the river.

The Main South Line railway from Christchurch to Invercargill runs through the town, though passenger services ceased in 2002 with the cancellation of the Southerner. Gore was once a busy railway junction; the Waimea Plains Railway ran west to connect with the Kingston Branch in Lumsden, while the Waikaka Branch connected with the Main South Line nearby in McNab. The original Kingston Flyer ran between Gore, on the main Dunedin-Invercargill line, and Kingston, from where lake steamers provided a connection with Queenstown. It was withdrawn in 1937, although specials continued into the 1950s. The 1970s revival of the Flyer did not include Gore.

Climate
In Köppen-Geiger climate classification system, it has an oceanic climate.

Media
The FM Hokonui radio station broadcasts from Gore to listeners in Southland and South Otago.

The smaller, locally owned radio station Cave FM broadcasts in Gore and online.

History
Before the arrival of Europeans the current site of Gore was a part of or near the routes used by Maori travellers. Tuturau, near modern Mataura, was the nearest Maori settlement.  In 1836 southern Maori repelled a raid from the north, which provided sufficient security for Europeans  to purchase land and settle in the area. By the mid-1850s large tracts nearby had been converted into sheep runs.

As crossing the Mataura River involved a long fording, the locality became known as "the Long Ford", or Longford. In 1862 a few town sections were surveyed on the west bank of the river and Longford was named Gore as a compliment to Sir Thomas Gore Browne, an early Governor of New Zealand. One of the first buildings was Long Ford House an accommodation house opened by local sawmill owner Daniel Morton

A village named Gordon after Governor Sir Arthur Gordon became established on the opposite bank of the Mataura. By 1864 a road from Balclutha through Gore to Invercargill had been opened for wheeled traffic which allowed  the establishment of a regular coach service between Invercargill and Dunedin.

Establishment
By 1877, there were enough business opportunities in the area for the Bank of New Zealand to establish a branch in Gore. Within three years both the Bank of Australasia and the Colonial Bank of New Zealand had also opened branches. In 1899 the Bank of New South Wales followed suit.

After its construction began in the early 1870s, a railway line between Invercargill and Gore was opened on 30 August 1875. By 22 January 1879 the railway had been extended to Balclutha where it linked with an existing line to Dunedin. A private Waimea Plains railway from Gore to Lumsden was opened on 31 July 1880. This was subsequently purchased by the Government in 1886. It connected Gore with the Invercargill-Kingston branch line. By 1908 another branch had been completed via McNab to Waikaka. The extension of the railways established Gore as an important hub and had a significant effect on its development.

By 1879, The Ensign newspaper was being published in the town, followed in 1887 by the rival Standard.

Borough
In 1885, Gore was constituted a borough and in 1890 Gordon, by now commonly known as East Gore, amalgamated with Gore.

Gore acquired a nickname of "Chicago of the South".

By 1905, the population had increased to 2,354, compared with 1,618 in 1891.

The establishment of the Gore Electric Light & Power Syndicate led in 1894 to Gore becoming the third town in New Zealand to install a generator and provide a public electricity supply.

From the end of the Second World War until 1976, Gore enjoyed prosperity driven by record prices for agricultural produce which saw the town’s population rise from 5,000 in 1945 to 9,000 in 1976. By the late 1960s, it was reputed to have the highest per-capita retail turnover of any New Zealand town.

Decline
The farm sector went into decline after 1976 which led to a corresponding decline in the population. Related businesses also closed, including the town’s iconic cereal mill, which had processed oats and other grains since 1877. Since 2000 prosperity has returned as large numbers of farms in the surrounding area were converted to dairy farms to take advantage of high prices for dairy produce. This growth has led to low unemployment in the town.

Marae

O Te Ika Rama Marae is in Gore. It is a marae (meeting ground) of the Hokonui Rūnanga branch of Ngāi Tahu, and includes O Te Ika Rama wharenui (meeting house).

In October 2020, the government committed $424,567 from the Provincial Growth Fund to upgrade the marae, creating eight jobs.

Demographics

Gore had a population of 7,911 at the 2018 New Zealand census, an increase of 219 people (2.8%) since the 2013 census, and an increase of 156 people (2.0%) since the 2006 census. There were 3,360 households. There were 3,807 males and 4,107 females, giving a sex ratio of 0.93 males per female, with 1,389 people (17.6%) aged under 15 years, 1,314 (16.6%) aged 15 to 29, 3,324 (42.0%) aged 30 to 64, and 1,884 (23.8%) aged 65 or older.

Ethnicities were 90.4% European/Pākehā, 11.7% Māori, 0.9% Pacific peoples, 2.6% Asian, and 1.5% other ethnicities (totals add to more than 100% since people could identify with multiple ethnicities).

The proportion of people born overseas was 8.8%, compared with 27.1% nationally.

Although some people objected to giving their religion, 47.7% had no religion, 43.1% were Christian, 0.3% were Hindu, 0.3% were Muslim, 0.2% were Buddhist and 1.4% had other religions.

Of those at least 15 years old, 612 (9.4%) people had a bachelor or higher degree, and 1,938 (29.7%) people had no formal qualifications. 702 people (10.8%) earned over $70,000 compared to 17.2% nationally. The employment status of those at least 15 was that 3,075 (47.1%) people were employed full-time, 960 (14.7%) were part-time, and 183 (2.8%) were unemployed.

Education

Gore has primary, intermediate and high schools.

The two secondary schools in Gore are: 
Gore High School is the largest school in Gore, and caters for years 9 to 13. It has a roll of  students. It opened in 1908.
It opened in 1969 as a private school, and became state-integrated in 1982.

The only intermediate school in Gore is 
It opened in 1972.

There are four primary schools in Gore, each serving years 1 to 6. 
East Gore School with  students. The school opened in 1886 as Gordon School, and took its current name in 1907.
Gore Main School with  students. Opened on 4 October 1878 with 40 pupils. Destroyed by fire on 3 July 1896. This second school was destroyed by fire on7 May 1920 and a replacement was opened in February 1922.  With the existing structure reaching the end of its useful life the fourth school on the site on 7 December 1984.
St Marys School, a state-integrated Catholic school with  students. The school opened in 1890. 
West Gore School with  students. It opened in 1953.

All these schools are coeducational. Rolls are as of

Culture and arts

Gore is well known for its connection with Country and Western music, with the annual New Zealand country music awards having been held in the town for 36 years. It has a sister city relationship with Tamworth, New South Wales, the "Country Music Capital of Australia".

Recently Gore has also gained a reputation as a centre for the visual arts in the southern South Island. A major bequest to the town's Eastern Southland Art Gallery by Dr. John Money has left the institution with one of the country's best collections of ethnological art. This is partnered by an impressive collection of modern New Zealand work, including several notable pieces by Ralph Hotere.

Landmarks and notable features

The Flemings "Creamoata Mill" is an iconic local building, with Flemings "Creamoata" brand of porridge once promoted by Flemings as the National Breakfast, and the mill itself considered one of the most modern cereal mills in the southern hemisphere. Production of all products was moved to Australia in 2001, and Creamoata was discontinued in 2008 after declining sales.  Goodman Fielder claimed that the plant was no longer viable as it was operating at less than one third of its capacity. The building's famous "Sgt Dan" remains because rights to it have been purchased by the buildings current owner "Sgt Dan Stockfoods Ltd". The building has a Category I listing with Heritage New Zealand.

The former East Gore Presbyterian Church of Aotearoa New Zealand is one of the two remaining wooden Gothic churches designed by the eminent architect R.A. Lawson.
Built in 1880 and registered as a category 2 historic place by Heritage New Zealand, No longer used as a place of worship the building is currently being converted into an art centre, with a studio and flat for visiting artists. The latter houses the bedroom furniture from the Royal Suite commissioned for the Queen's Royal Tour to Southland in 1954.

The Hokonui Moonshine Museum in the heritage precinct celebrates Gore's part in the "...colourful history of illicit whiskey making and consumption...", with illicit whiskey being produced in the Hokonui Hills to the west of the town up until the 1930s.

The St James Theatre on Irk Street is a theatre and cinema, with a main auditorium seating 450 people and a smaller room for 78. It announced in June 2021 that it was in danger of closing if it could not raise money for earthquake strengthening and other renovations.

Notable residents

Ronald Bannerman, a flying ace during World War I. Bannerman Park in north Gore is named after him.
Jimmy Cowan, international rugby player
James Hargest, politician and military leader
Amanda Hooper (Christie), International Women's Hockey
Luke Hurley, musician
Hadyn Jones, television journalist
Roy Kerr, mathematical physicist
Shona McFarlane, artist and broadcaster
Hugh McIntyre (1888–1982), chairman of the Alliance Freezing Company (Southland)
Brian McKechnie (born 1953), international cricket and rugby player
Justin Marshall, international rugby player
Mike Puru, radio host
Geoff Rabone, international cricketer
Eric Roy, politician
Jenny Shipley, former Prime Minister of New Zealand
Barry Soper, political journalist
Stu Wilson, international rugby player

See also
 Gore Aerodrome

References

Further reading

 A history of the Presbyterian Church in Gore.

Gore Heritage Trail Brochure.

External links

 Gore District Council
 The Golden Guitar Awards site
  Hocken Collection Bulletin 38 - New Zealand’s ‘Little Lichfield’ - The literature of Eastern Southland 

 
Gore District, New Zealand
Populated places in Southland, New Zealand